Ronald Weeks (1884-1973), was an English bowls player who competed at the British Empire Games.

Bowls career
He participated in the 1938 British Empire Games at Sydney in the pairs event and finished in fourth place.

Ronald was honorary secretary of the Winscombe Bowls Club and his brother Hubert was the captain of the same club.

Personal life
He was a farmer by trade and married Nora Kate Ralls, they lived at the Knapps in Winscombe, Somerset.

References

English male bowls players
Bowls players at the 1938 British Empire Games
1884 births
1973 deaths
Commonwealth Games competitors for England
Sportspeople from Somerset